Timothy Sherry (born July 8, 1994) is an American sport shooter. He won the gold medal in the men's 50 metres rifle three positions event at the 2019 Pan American Games held in Lima, Peru.

References

External links 
 

Living people
1994 births
Place of birth missing (living people)
American male sport shooters
Pan American Games medalists in shooting
Pan American Games gold medalists for the United States
Shooters at the 2019 Pan American Games
Medalists at the 2019 Pan American Games